Dohem is a commune in the Pas-de-Calais department in the Hauts-de-France region of France.

Geography
A farming village situated 9 miles (14 km) southwest of Saint-Omer, at the D190 and D193 crossroads.

Population

Places of interest
 The church of St.Omer, dating from the fifteenth century.

See also
Communes of the Pas-de-Calais department

References

Communes of Pas-de-Calais